Bornhausen is next to Rhüden the northernmost part of the town of Seesen am Harz in the district of Goslar, in Lower Saxony. It has an approximate population of 1030.

History 
The first time mentioned in a document 973 Anno Domini.

References

Villages in Lower Saxony
Goslar (district)